Pict is a statically typed programming language, one of the very few based on the π-calculus. Work on the language began at the University of Edinburgh in 1992, and development has been more or less dormant since 1998. The language is still at an experimental stage.

References

Sources
Benjamin C. Pierce and David N. Turner. Pict: A programming language based on the pi-calculus. Technical report, Computer Science Department, Indiana University, 1997

External links
, links to a compiler, manuals, tutorial

Experimental programming languages
Functional languages